Saberhagen is a surname. Notable people with the surname include:

Bret Saberhagen (born 1964), American baseball player
Fred Saberhagen (1930–2007), American writer

Fictional characters
Salem Saberhagen, character in the comic book series Sabrina the Teenage Witch